Tom Olbison (born 20 March 1991) is an English professional rugby league footballer who last played as a  forward for the Toronto Wolfpack in the Betfred Super League 

He has previously played for the Bradford Bulls and the Widnes Vikings in the Super League. He spent time on loan from Bradford at the Dewsbury Rams in the Championship.

Background
Tom Olbison was born in Leeds, West Yorkshire, England.

Olbison is from Leeds and was a member of the Bulls Scholarship Programme before joining the club in 2007. He made rapid strides in his two years at the club and was another player who was selected for the England Academy Tour to Australia. He was tipped for a big future in the game.

Bradford Bulls
2009 – 2009 Season

Olbison made his Super League début against Warrington Wolves, he did not feature for the Bradford club in any more games that season.

2010 – 2010 Season

Olbison featured in three consecutive games for the Bradford club, Warrington, Hull Kingston Rovers and Catalans Dragons. His next games for the Bulls were the final three games of 2010 against St. Helens, Wakefield Trinity Wildcats and Wigan. Olbison also featured in the Challenge Cup game against Dewsbury. His only try was against Catalans Dragons.

2011 – 2011 Season

Olbison featured in two of the three pre-season games. He played against Dewsbury and Keighley.

Olbison played in ten consecutive games from Round 2 (Wigan) until Round 11 (Leeds). Olbison's then appeared in an addition five consecutive games between Round 13 (Warrington) and Round 17 (St. Helens). Olbison also appeared in the Challenge Cup game against Wigan. He scored a try against Wakefield Trinity Wildcats. He picked up an injury and did not feature in any more games that season.

2012 – 2012 Season

Olbison featured in one of the four pre-season friendlies. He played against Castleford. He didn't feature in any more friendlies due to an injury he picked up in the Castleford game.

Olbison missed Rounds 1–9 due to an injury. He featured in two consecutive games from Round 11 (Widnes) to Round 12 (Huddersfield). Olbison also featured in nine consecutive games from Round 16 (Castleford Tigers) to Round 24 (Hull Kingston Rovers). Olbison also appeared in Round 26 (Hull F.C.) and Round 27 (Catalans Dragons). He also featured in the Challenge Cup against Doncaster.

2013 – 2013 Season

Olbison featured in the pre-season friendlies against Dewsbury and Leeds.

He featured in eleven consecutive games from Round 1 (Wakefield Trinity Wildcats) to Round 11 (London Broncos). Olbison was injured for Round 12. Tom featured in Round 14 (Leeds Rhinos) and Round 16 (Huddersfield). Olbison returned to the team for Round 18 (St. Helens) to Round 19 (Widnes). Tom was injured for Rounds 20–21. Olbison featured in Round 22 (Hull F.C.) to Round 27 (Huddersfield). He scored against Leeds (1 try) and Wakefield Trinity Wildcats (1 try). He signed an improved 2-year deal to stay with Bradford midway through the season.

2014 – 2014 Season

Olbison featured in the pre-season games against Hull FC and Castleford Tigers.

He featured in Round 1 (Castleford Tigers). He was injured for Round 2. Olbison featured in Round 3 (London Broncos) to Round 7 (Widnes) then in Round 9 (Leeds) to Round 27 (London Broncos). Tom also featured in Round 5 (Catalans Dragons) to the quarter-final (Warrington Wolves) in the Challenge Cup. He scored against London Broncos (1 try), Warrington (2 tries), Wakefield Trinity Wildcats (1 try), Salford (1 try), Catalans Dragons (1 try) and Widnes Vikings (1 try).

Olbison signed a new two-year deal with Bradford even though they were relegated to the Championship.

2015 – 2015 Season

Olbison featured in the pre-season friendlies against Castleford and Leeds.

He featured in Round 1 (Leigh Centurions) to Round 7 (Halifax) then in Round 9 (London Broncos) to Round 20 (Hunslet Hawks). Tom played in Round 22 (Leigh) to Round 23 (Halifax). Olbison played in Qualifier 1 (Sheffield Eagles) to Qualifier 6 (Leigh). Tom played in the £1 Million Game (Wakefield Trinity Wildcats). He also featured in the Challenge Cup in Round 4 (Workington Town) to Round 5 (Hull Kingston Rovers). He scored against Hunslet Hawks (1 try) and Sheffield Eagles (1 try).

2016 – 2016 Season

Olbison featured in the pre-season friendlies against Leeds and Castleford.

He featured in Round 1 (Featherstone Rovers) to Round 5 (Oldham) then in Round 7 (London Broncos) to Round 16 (Dewsbury). Olbison played in Round 18 (Batley) then in Round 20 (Leigh). He featured in Round 22 (Oldham) to Round 23 (Featherstone Rovers). Olbison played in the Championship Shield Game 1 (Whitehaven) to the Final (Sheffield Eagles). Tom played in the Challenge Cup in the 4th Round (Dewsbury). He scored against Swinton (3 tries), Dewsbury (1 try), Oldham (1 try) and Sheffield Eagles (1 try).

Widnes Vikings

Following Bradford's liquidation, Olbison became a free agent and signed a one-year deal with Super League side Widnes.

Statistics

References

External links 

Toronto Wolfpack profile
Widnes Vikings profile
Bradford Bulls profile
SL profile

1991 births
Living people
Bradford Bulls players
Dewsbury Rams players
English rugby league players
People educated at Garforth Academy
Rugby league players from Leeds
Rugby league second-rows
Toronto Wolfpack players
Widnes Vikings players